The Brazzaville–Kinshasa Bridge is a proposed road-rail bridge construction project over the Congo River that will connect the Republic of the Congo to the Democratic Republic of the Congo at their respective capitals, Brazzaville and Kinshasa. The project has proceeded intermittently, but work is slated to begin in 2023 and be completed in 2028.

Background 
The cities of Brazzaville and Kinshasa, capitals of the Republic of the Congo (ROC) and Democratic Republic of the Congo (DRC) respectively, are situated on opposite banks of the Congo River. They are considered the closest national capitals on Earth (excluding the Vatican since the city-state has no capital). Plans for a bridge crossing the Congo River to connect the two countries were financed in 1991 but shelved in 1993 due to a lack of sufficient funding and turmoil in the ROC.

The project was revived a decade later in 2003 by the ROC's Transport Infrastructure Unit (Cellule d’infrastructures de transport), which had previously cooperated with the European Union on similar projects in Central Africa. The proposed bridge was relocated downstream to take advantage of the narrower and rocky riverbed which would facilitate easier erection of bridge pierrs. The cost of construction was estimated to be between 40 million and 80 million euros in 2003. In January 2004, the project was endorsed by the Economic Community of Central African States (ECCAS), which by then was estimated to cost 403 million euros.

The project stalled in 2005 when DRC presidential chief of staff Léonard She Okitundu expressed that the project would adversely affect economic activity in its port towns of Boma and Matadi, which are key contributors to its economy. The DRC refused to endorse the bridge project without a commitment by the New Partnership for Africa's Development (NEPAD) to finance a deepwater port in Banana, its only city on the Atlantic coast. Okitundu also confirmed that sanctions by the African Union meant the DRC had been excluded from negotiations with NEPAD regarding the projects. A 2010 report by the World Bank stated that the proposed bridge would instead increase maritime traffic to Pointe-Noire, ROC's main port city on the Atlantic.

Following a study in 2009, the project laid dormant until a meeting was held in Libreville, Gabon in December 2016 between the two countries. In January 2017, the ECCAS reactivated the project, with the African Development Bank pledging 250 million euros to the project. The two Congos were to raise the remaining 110 million euros and seek donors for an additional 40 million euros. An agreement was formally signed in November 2018 between the ROC and DRC for a 1,575m-long toll bridge to connect their capitals.

Construction works have since been repeatedly delayed with works now expected to commence in 2023. The bridge is expected to be completed in 2028.

Gauge 
The rail link will be single track. Both sides of the bridge use the same 1067mm gauge.  For compatibility with AIHSRN third rails or Dual Gauge sleepers should be provided.

See also 

 List of road–rail bridges
 Railway stations in the Republic of the Congo
 List of railway stations in the Democratic Republic of the Congo
 Tripoli-Cape Town Highway
 Trans-African Highway network

References 

Bridges in the Democratic Republic of the Congo
Proposed bridges in Africa
Road-rail bridges
Rail transport in the Republic of the Congo
Rail transport in the Democratic Republic of the Congo
Buildings and structures in Brazzaville
Buildings and structures in Kinshasa
Democratic Republic of the Congo–Republic of the Congo border crossings
Transport in Kinshasa
Bridges over the Congo River